Subcancilla haneti is a species of sea snail, a marine gastropod mollusk, in the family Mitridae, the miters or miter snails.

Description
The length of the shell attains 23.4 mm.

Distribution
The species occurs off Mazatlan, Mexico.

References

External links
 Petit de la Saussaye S. (1852). Description de coquilles nouvelles. Journal de Conchyliologie. 3: 51-59
 Thorsson, W. M. and R. Salisbury. (2008). Living Mitridae—Indo-Pacific Subcancilla Part 5: Panamic & Caribbean Subcancilla. Internet Hawaiian Shell News. (December): 3-20

haneti
Gastropods described in 1852